Thomas Ephestion (born 9 June 1995) is a professional footballer who plays as a midfielder for Nemzeti Bajnokság I club Mezőkövesdi SE. Born in metropolitan France, he plays for the Martinique national team.

Club career
On 27 January 2021, Ephestion joined RWDM on loan.

On 5 July 2022, Ephestion moved to RWDM on a permanent basis.

International career
Ephestion's origin is from France's overseas region of Martinique. He was called up to the Martinique national football team for 2019–20 CONCACAF Nations League qualifying matches in March 2019. He made his debut for the squad on 23 March 2019 in a game against Guadeloupe, as a starter.

References

External links

Living people
1995 births
People from Sucy-en-Brie
Footballers from Val-de-Marne
Association football midfielders
French footballers
French people of Martiniquais descent
Martiniquais footballers
Martiniquais expatriate footballers
Martinique international footballers
Challenger Pro League players
Valenciennes FC players
Olympique de Marseille players
AS Béziers (2007) players
RC Lens players
US Orléans players
K.V.C. Westerlo players
RWDM47 players
Mezőkövesdi SE footballers
Championnat National 3 players
Championnat National 2 players
Championnat National players
Ligue 2 players
Nemzeti Bajnokság I players
Expatriate footballers in Belgium
French expatriate sportspeople in Belgium
Martiniquais expatriate sportspeople in Belgium
Expatriate footballers in Hungary
French expatriate sportspeople in Hungary
Martiniquais expatriate sportspeople in Hungary